Sweet Lord is the third collaboration album from California rapper Murs (of the Living Legends) and North Carolina producer 9th Wonder (formerly of Little Brother). Like their other collaborations the album features ten songs, all produced by 9th Wonder, and is less than 40 minutes long. Murs stated in an online video that the album would be released for free through the internet as a "present" to his fans but only if they promise to actually purchase his album Murs for President and other albums he does with 9th Wonder.

Track listing

References

External links 

2008 albums
Murs (rapper) albums
9th Wonder albums
Albums produced by 9th Wonder